The 1998 Colorado Buffaloes football team represented the University of Colorado at Boulder during the 1998 NCAA Division I-A football season. The team played their home games at Folsom Field in Boulder, Colorado, and were members of the North Division of the Big 12 Conference. They were led by fourth-year head coach Rick Neuheisel, who departed in early January for Washington of the Pacific-10 Conference. He was succeeded by Gary Barnett, the head coach at Northwestern of the Big Ten Conference.

Schedule

References

Colorado
Colorado Buffaloes football seasons
Aloha Bowl champion seasons
Colorado Buffaloes football